Nathaniel George Terence Coombs (born August 1977) is a British television and radio presenter, and writer.

Education
Coombs was educated at the boys' independent school Dulwich College in Dulwich, South London, and at University College London.

Sports television and radio

Coombs is primarily a sports presenter — specialising in football and US Sports – and has worked with BBC, Channel 4, Channel 5, ESPN, The Guardian, Bleacher Report, The Times and Talksport.

American football
In 2007 he began presenting Channel 5's live NFL American football coverage, alongside Mike Carlson broadcasting all Sunday Night Football and some Monday Night Football games. He hosted Channel 5 coverage between 2007-2010 and also co-presented NFL: UK, a weekly magazine show, also on Channel 5 that was shown on Saturday mornings, alongside Trevor Nelson and Natalie Pinkham.

After Channel 5 ended its US Sport coverage Coombs moved to Channel 4 in 2012 when it became the home of NFL on UK TV where he hosted NFL Live on Channel 4 every Sunday night alongside Mike Carlson, the NFL International Series Games and Super Bowl, and The American Football Show every Saturday Morning alongside Vernon Kay.

When Channel 4 dropped the NFL after the 2015 Super Bowl, the BBC agreed to a TV deal with the NFL and Coombs has hosted the live International Series coverage in 2015, 2016, 2017, 2018 & 2019.

In 2013, he joined commercial UK Sports Radio station TalkSport as an anchor, where he has hosted various shows including The NFL Show, Kick Off, Football First, Transfer Tavern and The European Football Show.

Prior to joining TalkSport, Coombs presented MLB coverage (including the World Series) on BBC Radio, where he was the regular host of the weekly MLB show between 2010–2013.

In 2013, he presented a range of football coverage for the global football site Goal.com and in June 2014 began work with The Guardian fronting much of its football video content, including a daily World Cup show which took a satirical look back at the previous night's action.

As one of ESPN UK's main live studio hosts between 2010-2013, he presented the live studio football show Talk of the Terrace in its various formats, as well as being the regular anchor for the channel's live Bundesliga studio coverage. He has also anchored live football coverage from Serie A and Ligue 1. Coombs often interviews players and provides features for other ESPN football output and presented ESPN's coverage of the 2012 and 2013 World Darts Championships.

Coombs & Carlson were also part of the Americarnage podcast which they co-hosted, along with comedian Dan Louw, from 2011 to 2016. The show has nominated twice in the Podcast Awards (2011 & 2013) under the "Best Sports" category and has been featured on the frontpage of iTunes. He also hosted the Channel 4 #C4NFL : The Extra Yard weekly podcast and in 2018 launched The NFL Show with Nat Coombs podcast.

He has worked on many television and radio shows as a talking head or panelist and writes a weekly NFL column for The Times.

Darts
In 2018/2019 he presented Eurosport's coverage of the BDO World Darts Championship.

Comedy and writing

He began his career as a stand up comedian and was a semi-finalist at the BBC New Comedy Awards and a runner-up of Stand-up Britain on ITV.  He was also a Regional Finalist of the Jongleurs J20 competition and a Semi-finalist in both the Amused Moose & Laughing Horse New Act competitions. Early in his career appeared on the BBC Radio comedy program 'Spanking New' alongside comedians including Rhod Gilbert and Shappi Khorsandi which featured live performances from some of the UK's best new comedy talent.

Whilst working as a comedian, Coombs created the innovative digital comedy show Chelsey OMG which he wrote and co-produced. The first series of the show, based on his character Chelsey Pucks, which originally appeared on Radio 1 comedy sketch show The Milk Run, debuted on the online social networking site Bebo. The show drew critical acclaim for its interactive format, whereby the characters interact with the show's fans. Coombs appears in the show as Jens, a German fashion photographer.

His stand up work has been variously described as “incredibly stylish, with up-to-the-minute stuff” by John Pidgeon and "like the Strokes beating the s*** out of Westlife in a car park" in Time Out magazine. In June 2006, he took part in the Just for Pitching competition at the Just for Laughs comedy festival in Montreal, where journalist Tamsen Tillson from Variety magazine described him as "setting tongues wagging" .

Coombs also co-starred in the BAFTA-nominated BBC drama Can You Hear Me Thinking? alongside Judi Dench.

Coombs regularly writes or contributes US sports content to the UK print & online media including the British website of ESPN and has his own column on the ESPN America website.

Personal life
Coombs has followed the National Football League since he was a child and is a fan of the Miami Dolphins. He is a fan of the English football team West Ham United who he watches regularly and is the top ranked celebrity fan of ESPN's Five Time Award Winning "Fantasy Focus: Football 06010" daily podcast, hosted by Field Yates and Matthew Berry. Coombs makes an annual appearance on the podcast, usually during the week of which an NFL game will be played in Britain. He's married and lives in London .

References

External links
Vivienne Clore Talent Agency
Nat Coombs official website
Stardoll to launch video channel with comedy series New Media Age 4 June 2009
Nat Coombs Group Facebook
Nat Coombs Twitter
Tea with Tony La Russa (blog)

1977 births
Living people
British television presenters
British comedians
People educated at Dulwich College
Alumni of University College London
English television presenters
Major League Baseball broadcasters
National Football League announcers